Kurtziella dorvilliae , common name Dorvill's mangelia, is a species of sea snail, a marine gastropod mollusc in the family Mangeliidae.

Description
The length of the shell attains 10.5 mm.

The shell is rather thin and narrowly shouldered. It is longitudinally plicated, with fine revolving striae, more conspicuous towards the base. Its color is whitish, with a pale brown three-line zone.

Distribution
K. dorvilliae can be found in Atlantic waters, ranging from the eastern coast of Florida south to Brazil.; in the Caribbean Sea, the Gulf of Mexico and the Lesser Antilles.

References

 Rosenberg, G., F. Moretzsohn, and E. F. García. 2009. Gastropoda (Mollusca) of the Gulf of Mexico, Pp. 579–699 in Felder, D.L. and D.K. Camp (eds.), Gulf of Mexico–Origins, Waters, and Biota. Biodiversity. Texas A&M Press, College Station, Texas

External links
  Tucker, J.K. 2004 Catalog of recent and fossil turrids (Mollusca: Gastropoda). Zootaxa 682:1–1295.
 

dorvilliae
Gastropods described in 1845